The 1892–93 season was the fourth in existence for Sheffield United.  This was their first season playing in the recently formed Football League Second Division as the club sought to establish itself as a major footballing force.  With some members of the football committee unconvinced of the long-term future of the Football League, the club also retained its membership of the Northern League.

Background
Sheffield United had finished third in the Northern League the previous season.  Their ambition, however, was to play in the Football League and in April 1982 their application to join was successful at the second attempt.  The club's application had previously been rejected in 1891 but with the league being expanded from 12 to 28 teams United, along with a number of other clubs including local rivals The Wednesday, were elected to play in the Football League for the 1892–93 season.  To the annoyance of the club's directors however, whereas The Wednesday were given entry directly into the First Division, United were placed in the newly formed Second Division.   Despite their Football League application being successful some members of United's football committee were unconvinced of its long-term future, and so the club elected to retain its membership of the Northern League as well.

Kit
With the club now a member of The Football League, United elected to adopt a new jersey consisting of thick red and white stripes.  This replaced the all white jersey they had worn in the previous season and was the first introduction of a strip that has remained (some minor alterations aside) to the present day.  United retained their white jersey as a change strip and matched both shirts with blue knickers and socks.  The club badge that had also adorned their jerseys the previous season was also dropped.

Season

Pre-season
With United set to play in the newly formed Football League Second Division the club looked to strengthen its squad, as a number of fringe players departed Bramall Lane.  Squad players William Getliff and W. Nesbitt were not retained, and long-serving defender Ned Stringer retired from playing to take up a scouting post with the club.  Billy Bairstow was allowed to join local side Penistone, while Thomas Smith's brief stay with the club came to an end as he was signed by Yorkshire neighbours Barnsley.

Moving in the opposite direction, Walter Wigmore was signed from Worksop Town on 12 June.  By July United had added defender William Mellor, and signed striker Arthur McCabe from nearby Rotherham Town on a free transfer.  Sheffield born defender George Waller, who had played in the 1890 FA Cup Final for cross–city rivals The Wednesday, was signed from Middlesbrough at the start of August, before the club's pre-season dealings concluded with the arrival of wide player Joe Brady arrived from Renton.  Despite this influx of new players, the established first team remained largely unchanged from the previous season, with those players signed during the summer being used mainly as reserves and making relatively few first team appearances.

With the new season about to start, United kicked off their fixture list with a show-piece friendly game against established Scottish side Celtic, beating their visitors 1–0 courtesy of a Harry Hammond goal.

Squad
Source:

First team

Players leaving before the end of the season

Transfers

In

Out

League tables
Source:

Football League Second Division

Northern League

Squad statistics
Source:

Appearances and goals

|-
|colspan="14"|Players who left before the end of the season:

|}

Top scorers

Results
Source:

Key

Division Two

Test match

FA Cup

Northern League

Wharncliffe Charity Cup

Challenge match

Friendlies

Notes

Bibliography

References

External links
 Sheffield United F.C. Official Website

Sheffield United F.C. seasons
Sheffield United